Lissopogonus is a genus of ground beetles in the family Carabidae. There are about eight described species in Lissopogonus.

Species
These eight species belong to the genus Lissopogonus:
 Lissopogonus borneensis Baehr, 2001  (Borneo and Indonesia)
 Lissopogonus glabellus Andrewes, 1923  (Afghanistan, India, and Laos)
 Lissopogonus loebli Deuve, 2009  (Nepal)
 Lissopogonus morvani Deuve, 2009  (Nepal)
 Lissopogonus nanlingensis (Deuve & Tian, 2001)  (China)
 Lissopogonus poecilus Andrewes, 1933  (Indonesia)
 Lissopogonus suensoni Kirschenhofer, 1991  (China)
 Lissopogonus tonkinensis Zamotajlov & Sciaky, 1996  (Vietnam)

References

Carabidae